The Buffett Cup is a bridge trophy which is awarded biennially in an event between teams from Europe and the United States.

The tournament is modeled on the Ryder Cup golf competition and is held in the week preceding the golf event at a nearby location. The competition was first held in 2006 and is named after its sponsor, American businessman Warren Buffett. Teams are selected by invitation and must contain at least two female players. The competition format is a mixture of teams of four, pairs and individual sessions with point-a-board scoring throughout.

The tournament was scheduled to be held in Monaco in 2014, but was cancelled owing to disagreement within the USA side as to how members of its team were chosen.

The Buffett Cup is resumed in 2019 in Haikou, China. Besides the Europe and USA teams, the China team is also invited as the first time of the Buffett Cup.

Results

Summary

By Year

2019 Haikou, Hainan Province, China
(1st) USA - 972.3; (2nd) Europe - 967.7; (3rd) China - 953

2012 Omaha, Nebraska
USA won 107-103.

2010 Cardiff, Wales
USA won 109-89.

2008 Louisville, Kentucky, USA
Europe won 205.5-172.5.

2006 Dublin, Ireland
USA won by 23.

References

Contract bridge zonal competitions